Galaxie Amnéville (also known as Galaxie Mega Hall, Galaxie de Metz, Galaxie d'Amnéville or simply Le Galaxie) is an indoor arena located in the commune of Amnéville, France (a suburb of Metz). The arena is primarily used for concerts and other music-related events. However, it also houses handball tournaments.

Background
In 1987, Jean Kiffer, deputy mayor of Amnéville proposed a new entertainment centre for Lorraine to host musical and sporting events. Originally, the  Ministère de la Culture et de la Communication to construct a Zénith in Amnéville. However, these plans were abandoned with the organization later opening Zénith de Nancy in Maxéville, 1993. Known as Salle Thermal, the original plans were to construct a casino to include an open-air amphitheater seating 5,400. In 1989, plans were changed to now construct an indoor arena, seating at least 8,000. 
The arena was designed in the same vein as the Zénith de Paris however large enough to compete with the Palais Omnisports de Paris-Bercy. Designed by Jean-Luc Chancerel, construction began in March 1990 and was completed in nine months (six months ahead of schedule). Seating was expanded from 8,000 to 12,200. The arena opened to the public in December 1990, with its first event held 4 January 1991; a concert by Patricia Kaas.

Selected performers

Tokio Hotel
Céline Dion
Joe Cocker
Muse
Iron Maiden
Toto
Scorpions
Genesis
Chris Rea
Deep Purple
Linkin Park
Snoop Dogg and P. Diddy
Placebo
Rammstein
INXS
Sting
Julio Iglesias
Depeche Mode
AC/DC
Arturo Brachetti
André Rieu
Simply Red
Texas
David Bowie
Whitney Houston
Elton John
Phil Collins
Simple Minds
Peter Gabriel
Joe Satriani
George Michael
Status Quo
The Fugees
Lenny Kravitz
Moby
The Cranberries
Guns N' Roses
Alicia Keys
Shakira
James Blunt
Barclay James Harvest
Kylie Minogue
50 Cent
Laura Pausini
Beyoncé
Britney Spears
The Offspring
Thirty Seconds to Mars
LMFAO
Jennifer Lopez
One Direction
Lana Del Rey
5 Seconds Of Summer
Queen + Adam Lambert

Buildings and structures in Moselle (department)
Music venues in France
Tourist attractions in Moselle (department)